Simões is a Portuguese surname meaning "son of Simão."

People

Notable people with the surname include:

 João Simões Lopes Neto (1865–1916), Brazilian journalist and author
 JP Simões (1970), Portuguese singer and musician
 Bruno Simões (1971–2012), Portuguese actor[:pt]
 Francisco Simões (1946), Portuguese sculptor and artist[:pt]
 Jefferson Cardia Simões (1958), Brazilian pioneer glaciologist[:pt]
 Francisco Simões Margiochi, better known as Francisco Margiochi (1774–1838), Portuguese mathematician, professor, and politician[:pt]
 Francisco Simões Margiochi, better known as Simões Margiochi (1848–1904), Portuguese agronomist, author, and politician[:pt]
 Yuri Simões, Brazilian mixed martial artist

Footballers
 José Simões (born 1913; deceased), Portuguese footballer
 António Simões (born 1943), Portuguese footballer and coach
 Carlos Simões (born 1951), Portuguese footballer
 René Simões (born 1952), Brazilian footballer and football coach
 Victor Simões (born 1981), Brazilian footballer
 Eduardo Simões (born 1982), Portuguese footballer
 Hugo Simões (born 1986), Portuguese footballer
 Bruno Simões Teixeira (born 1988), Brazilian footballer
 André Simões (born 1989), Portuguese footballer
 Fabiana da Silva Simões (born 1989), Brazilian footballer
 Jaime Daniel Melão Simões (born 1989), Portuguese footballer
 Diego Simões (born 1991), Brazilian footballer

Alternate spellings of the surname
 Marcelo Simoes (fl. 1985), American engineer
Preeti Simoes, TV producer

See also
 Simões, Piauí, community in Brazil
 Simões Filho, municipality in Brazil

Portuguese-language surnames
Patronymic surnames
Surnames from given names